James Bennett (18 December 1912 – 17 September 1984) was a Scottish Labour Party politician.

He was elected to the House of Commons in 1961 at a by-election in 1961 in the Glasgow Bridgeton constituency, following the resignation of the sitting Labour (formerly ILP) MP James Carmichael.

Bennett held the seat until its abolition at the February 1974 general election.

References

External links 
 

1912 births
1984 deaths
Scottish Labour MPs
Members of the Parliament of the United Kingdom for Glasgow constituencies
UK MPs 1959–1964
UK MPs 1964–1966
UK MPs 1966–1970
UK MPs 1970–1974